L'Invitation au voyage may refer to:

 L'Invitation au voyage, a poem by Charles Baudelaire in his collection Les Fleurs du mal
L'Invitation au voyage, any of several musical settings of Baudelaire's poem, including ones by Henri Duparc and Emmanuel Chabrier
L'Invitation au voyage, a 1927 French silent film directed by Germaine Dulac
 Invitation au voyage, a 1982 French film directed by Peter Del Monte
L'Invitation au voyage,  2005 French documentary television series about Palestinian poet Mahmoud Darwish and Israeli novelist Aharon Applefeld